Sefid Khani or Safid Khani may refer to:

East Azerbaijan Province
Sefid Khani, East Azerbaijan, a village in Meyaneh County

Gilan Province
Sefid Khani, Gilan, a village in Shaft County

Hamadan Province
Sefid Khani, Hamadan, a village in Nahavand County

Ilam Province
Sefid Khani-ye Olya, a village in Shirvan and Chardaval County, Ilam Province, Iran
Sefid Khani-ye Sofla, a village in Shirvan and Chardaval County, Ilam Province, Iran
Sefid Khani-ye Vosta, a village in Shirvan and Chardaval County, Ilam Province, Iran

Kerman Province
Sefid Khani, Kerman, a village in Baft County

Kermanshah Province
Sefid Khani, Kermanshah, a village in Sahneh County

Lorestan Province
Sefid Khani, Delfan, a village in Delfan County, Lorestan Province, Iran
Sefid Khani Ahmedvand, a village in Delfan County, Lorestan Province, Iran
Sefid Khani-ye Kuchek, a village in Delfan County, Lorestan Province, Iran
Sefid Khani, Kuhdasht, a village in Kuhdasht County, Lorestan Province, Iran
Sefid Khani-ye Jadid, a village in Kuhdasht County, Lorestan Province, Iran